Najat Abdel Samad (born 1967) is a Syrian writer, translator, and obstetrician. She has published four novels including "No Water Takes It" which was awarded Katara Prize for Arabic Novel. She has translated two Russian books into Arabic including the story "Memoirs of a Young Doctor" by the Russian writer Mikhail Bulgakov.

Education and career 
Samad was born in As-Suwayda, Syria in 1967. She currently lives in Germany. She graduated from Damascus University with a degree in Arabic Language and Literature. She has four published novels. Her first novel "Bilad al-Manafi" was published by Dar al-Rayyis in 2010. Abdel Samad has also translations from the Russian language such as "The Memoirs of a Young Doctor" by the Russian writer Mikhail Bulgakov, which was a joint work with other translators; Osama Abu Al-Hassan and Thaer Zain Al-Din. In 2018, Abdel Samad's novel "La Maa Yarweeha" won the Katara Prize for Arabic Novels in the category of published Arab novels.

Selected works 

 "Muthakarat Tabib Shab", 2005
 "Belad Al Manafi",2010
 "Ghornikat Suria", 2013
 "Fi Hananya Al Harb", 2015
 "La Ma Yarweeha", 2016

Awards 

 2018: her novel "La Maa Yarweena" won the Katara Prize for Arabic Novels in the category of published Arab novels.

References 

1967 births
Living people
Syrian obstetricians
Syrian women physicians
Syrian novelists
Syrian women writers